Adedeji Olanrewaju Oduwole (born August 23, 1987) is a former professional defensive lineman for the Winnipeg Blue Bombers of the Canadian Football League. He signed with the Blue Bombers as an undrafted free agent on March 30, 2010. He played college football for the Saint Mary's Huskies in 2005 before transferring to the University of Calgary to play for the Dinos from 2007-2009. Oduwole is also an active member of the community.

After his playing career, Oduwole became a chef, and appeared on season 7 of Beat Bobby Flay, where he won the first round, but lost to Bobby Flay in the second round.

References

External links
Just Sports Stats

1987 births
Living people
Calgary Dinos football players
Canadian football defensive linemen
Players of Canadian football from British Columbia
Saint Mary's Huskies football players
Winnipeg Blue Bombers players
People from Coquitlam